The Church of Jesus Christ of Latter-day Saints in Switzerland has a rich history beginning in 1850. As of December 31, 2021, The Church of Jesus Christ of Latter-day Saints (LDS Church) reported 9,160 members in Switzerland, organized in five stakes and 35 congregations (27 wards and 8 branches).

History

Missionary work for LDS Church began in Switzerland on November 24, 1850 when the Swiss Mission was created. The Swiss Mission later became the Swiss and Italian Mission and the Swiss, Italian, and German Mission. Many early converts were baptized, but then emigrated to the United States until the 1950s.

On September 11, 1955 the LDS Church completed its first temple in Europe when the Bern Switzerland Temple was completed in Zollikofen. The temple was later remodeled and rededicated by Gordon B. Hinckley in October 1992. In 1994, Howard W. Hunter visited Switzerland as the new LDS Church president.

Hans B. Ringger was a Swiss national who was a leader of the LDS Church in Switzerland. Born on 2 November 1925, in Zurich, Switzerland, his grandmother, Elizabeth Zoebeli Ringger, joined the LDS Church in 1896 and his parents, Carl Ringger, Jr., and Maria Reif, were also active members. Ringger eventually became an LDS Church general authority. Stephen Nadauld and Douglas Bischoff served as missionaries for the church in Switzerland, with Nadauld later serving as president of the Switzerland Geneva Mission from 2003 to 2006.

As of 2020, members total approximately 8,000, with many coming from second, third, and fourth generations of members in Switzerland. Forty congregations meet in 27 meetinghouses.

Stakes

As of February 2023, the Switzerland had the following stakes and congregations:

Only congregations in Switzerland are listed in the count. Congregations within each stake that meet outside the country are not listed.

Missions
Alpine German-speaking Mission 
France Lyon Mission
Italy Milan Mission

Temples

See also

Religion in Switzerland

References

External links
 Switzerland Official site
 ComeUntoChrist.org Latter-day Saints Visitor site
 FindeChristus.org